The Victoria Park Lawn Tennis Tournament  also called the Victoria Park LTC Tournament  was an early Victorian era men's  and women's grass court tennis tournament first staged in June 1881 at the Victoria Park Lawn Tennis Club, Exeter, Devon, England. It was staged only four times until 1884.

History
The Victoria Park Lawn Tennis Tournament, was an early open men's  and women's grass court tennis tournament first staged in 1881 at the Victoria Park Lawn Tennis Club, Mount Radford, Exeter, Devon, England, The first edition was held between 29 and 31 August 1881, the men's  singles was won by Mr. Champion Branfill Russell. The final edition was held from 7 to 9 September 1883, the men's  singles was won by Mr. Charles Walder Grinstead.

References

Sources
 Exeter and Plymouth Gazette Daily Telegrams (September 1881) Exeter, Devon. England.
 Exeter and Plymouth Gazette Daily Telegrams (31 July 1884) Exeter, Devon. England.
  Nieuwland, Alex. "Tournament – Exeter". www.tennisarchives.com. Tennis Archives.
 Routledges Sporting Annual (1882) George Routledge and Son. London.    
 Routledges Sporting Annual (1883) George Routledge and Son. London.

Defunct tennis tournaments in the United Kingdom
Grass court tennis tournaments